Batasan station is an under-construction Manila Metro Rail Transit (MRT) station situated on Line 7 located in Batasan Hills, Quezon City, Philippines. It is near the Sandiganbayan Centennial Building, Public Attorneys Office Building, Batasan TODA Terminal, the Commission on Audit Complex and the Batasan Pambansa Complex. It is the ninth station for trains headed towards the North Triangle Common Station and the sixth station for trains headed to San Jose del Monte.

History

Batasan station is part of the MRT Line 7, which was proposed initially in 2004. The line was supposed to begin its construction in 2005 with a target opening date in 2007. However, construction did not start until 2017, a decade after its target opening date. Groundbreaking of the station began on October 7, 2017, with a simple ceremony being held before the concrete pouring for the station's bored pile foundations.

The official working name of the station during the design phase is Station 6. It is also known by another previous working name: South Batasan. It was named so because it is located at the southern end of Batasan Road while Manggahan station was previously called as North Batasan.

, the project is 66.07% complete; the station's construction is to be finished by June of the same year.

Services

Batasan station is a part of the MRT Line 7, which runs from San Jose del Monte, Bulacan up to North Avenue, Quezon City. It is the sixth northbound station from the North Triangle Common Station in Quezon City and the ninth southbound station from San Jose del Monte. The station is served by jeepneys and bus lines, and the nearby Batasan TODA Station improves its access throughout Batasan Hills and nearby places.

References

External links

Proposed Batasan MRT Station

Manila Metro Rail Transit System stations
Railway stations under construction in the Philippines